The Vixen series of nuclear tests were all safety experiments, in which a bomb mechanism with a live core was subjected to abnormal conditions, such as fire, shock, and electrical malfunctions to determine whether nuclear criticality would occur. The result is no nuclear criticality, but the high explosives that triggered the fission bomb may explode, destroying the bomb and spreading the core material over a localized area.

Notes

References

Vixen